The 2010 Asian Junior Athletics Championships was the 14th edition of the international athletics competition for Asian under-20 athletes, organised by the Asian Athletics Association. It took place from 1 to 4 July 2010 at the My Dinh National Stadium in Hanoi – the first time the competition was held in Vietnam. A total of 44 events were contested, which were divided equally between male and female athletes. Three championship records were improved over the course of the four-day competition and numerous national junior records were also bettered. The competition, including its opening and closing ceremonies, was broadcast live on Vietnamese carrier VTV3.

China was easily the most successful nation, topping the medal tally with thirteen gold medals and 26 medals in total. Kazakhstan initially had the second greatest number of winners, with 5 of their eight medals being gold medals, but positive doping tests later reduced them to eighth in the ranking. Second-placed Japan (with four golds) had a much larger overall haul, taking 22 medals at the competition. Chinese Taipei placed third with four golds and thirteen medals in total, while India had the third highest medal tally, with fourteen medals. Among the 21 nations that won medals in Hanoi, Thailand, Qatar and Bahrain were others to feature prominently on the podiums. The hosts, Vietnam, did not manage to secure a gold medal, but they still finished with a total of five medals.

Some athletes used the championships as their final preparation before the 2010 World Junior Championships in Athletics, which was held in Moncton, Canada, later that month. Mutaz Essa Barshim provided one of the event highlights in the men's high jump as he broke the championship record as well setting the Qatari senior record with a clearance of 2.31 m. Another Qatari, Mohamed Al-Garni completed a double in the men's 800 metres and 1500 metres. Thailand's Supachai Chimdee set a championship record in the men's 200 metres and also helped the Thais to victory in both relay events. India's Harminder Singh was the third competition record-breaker, winning the hammer throw in 71.53 metres – also an Indian junior record.

Yulia Gavrilova of Kazakhstan initially scored a sprint triple, winning the 100 metres, 200 m and 4×100 metres relay, but at the event she had a positive drug test for the banned substance nandrolone, which saw all of her results at the competition retrospectively annulled.  Iraq's Gulustan Mahmood Ieso took the 400 metres and 800 metres. Chinese athlete Gu Siyu was dominant in the women's throws, winning both the shot put and discus competitions. Her compatriot Jiang Shan took 100/200 m silvers and a relay bronze, while Zhang Xiaojun was also twice runner-up (in the 800 and 1500 m). Genzebe Shumi led Bahrain's success in the middle- and long-distance track events, winning the 1500 m and taking 3000 metres silver.

Records

Men

Women

Medal summary

Men

Women

† = The following results and medals for Kazakhstan were retrospectively annulled after Yulia Gavrilova's positive doping test:
100 metres:  (11.85)
200 metres:  (23.41 NJR)
4×100 m relay:  Aygerim Shynyzbekova, Olga Bludova, Viktoriya Zyabkina, Yulia Gavrilova (45.57)

2010 Medal table

† = All tallies marked with the above symbol signify retrospective amendments due to Yulia Gavrilova's doping ban. Kazakhstan lost three gold medals due to this, but also gained two bronze medals as other Kazakh athletes were elevated in ranking. Chinese Taipei gained a relay bronze medal. China saw two silver medals and a bronze elevated to two golds and a silver, India has a silver and a bronze upgraded to gold and a silver, while Indonesian had one bronze amended to a silver medal. This profoundly effected Kazakhstan's final rankings – initially the runner-up, they were down graded to joint eighth position. Japan and Chinese Taipei became the second- and third-ranked countries. India moved from eighth to sixth, while Indonesia went from joint 19th to joint 18th.

References

Results
 AsC  Hanoi  VIE  1 - 4 July. Tilastopaja.org (5 July 2010). Retrieved on 2013-12-27.
 14th Asian Junior Athletics Championship 2010 1-4 July, Hanoi, Vietnam – RESULT- Day1. Asian Athletics Association. Retrieved on 2010-08-28.
 14th Asian Junior Athletics Championship 2010 1-4 July, Hanoi, Vietnam – RESULT- Day2. Asian Athletics Association. Retrieved on 2010-08-28.
 14th Asian Junior Athletics Championship 2010 1-4 July, Hanoi, Vietnam – RESULT- Day3. Asian Athletics Association. Retrieved on 2010-08-28.
 14th Asian Junior Athletics Championship 2010 1-4 July, Hanoi, Vietnam – RESULT- Day4. Asian Athletics Association. Retrieved on 2010-08-28.
 Junior Men Decathlon Final Results (1-2 July 2010). Asian Athletics Association. Retrieved on 2010-08-28.
 Junior Women Heptathlon Final Results (3-4 July 2010). Asian Athletics Association. Retrieved on 2010-08-28.
 14th Asian Junior Athletics Championship 2010 1-4 July, Hanoi, Vietnam – Medal Tally (after 44 events). Asian Athletics Association. Retrieved on 2010-08-28.

External links
Official website

Asian Junior Championships
2010
International athletics competitions hosted by Vietnam
Sport in Hanoi
2010 in Vietnamese sport
2010 in Asian sport
2010 in youth sport
2010 Asian Junior Athletics Championships